Isoline retrieval is a remote sensing inverse method that retrieves one or more isolines of a trace atmospheric constituent or variable. When used to validate another contour, it is the most accurate method possible for the task.  When used to retrieve a whole field, it is a general, nonlinear inverse method and a robust estimator.

For validating advected contours

Rationale

Suppose we have, as in contour advection, inferred knowledge of a
single contour or isoline of an atmospheric constituent, q
and we wish to validate this against satellite remote-sensing data.
Since satellite instruments cannot measure the constituent directly,
we need to perform some sort of inversion.
In order to validate the contour, it is not necessary to know,
at any given point, the exact value of the constituent.  We only need to
know whether it falls inside or outside, that is, is it greater
than or less than the value of the contour, q0.

This is a classification problem.  Let:

 

be the discretized variable.
This will be related to the satellite measurement vector,
by some conditional probability,
which we approximate by collecting samples, called training data, of both the
measurement vector and the state variable, q.
By generating classification results over the region of interest
and using any contouring algorithm to separate the
two classes, the isoline will have been "retrieved."

The accuracy of a retrieval will be given by integrating
the conditional probability over the area of interest, A:

where c is the retrieved class at position, .
We can maximize this quantity by maximizing the value of the integrand
at each point:

Since this is the definition of maximum likelihood,
a classification algorithm based on maximum likelihood
is the most accurate method possible of validating an advected contour.
A good method for performing maximum likelihood classification
from a set of training data is variable kernel density estimation.

Training data

There are two methods of generating the training data.
The most obvious is empirically, by simply matching measurements of
the variable, q, with collocated
measurements from the satellite instrument.  In this case,
no knowledge of the actual physics that produce the measurement
is required and the retrieval algorithm is purely statistical.
The second is with a forward model:

where  is the state vector and
q = xk is a single component.
An advantage of this method is that state vectors need not
reflect actual atmospheric configurations, they need only
take on a state that could reasonably occur in the real atmosphere.
There are also none of the errors inherent in
most collocation procedures,
e.g. because of offset errors in the locations of the paired samples
and differences in the footprint sizes of the two instruments.
Since retrievals will be biased towards more common states,
however, the statistics ought to reflect those in the real world.

Error characterization

The conditional probabilities, provide
excellent error characterization, therefore the classification
algorithm ought to return them.
We define the confidence rating by rescaling the conditional
probability:

 

where nc is the number of classes (in this case, two).
If C is zero, then the classification is little better than
chance, while if it is one, then it should be perfect.
To transform the confidence rating to a statistical tolerance,
the following line integral can be applied to an isoline retrieval
for which the true isoline is known:

where s is the path, l is the length of the isoline
of position.
While it appears that the integral must be evaluated separately
for each value of the confidence rating, C, in fact it may be
done for all values of C by sorting the confidence ratings of the
results, .
The function relates the threshold value of the confidence rating
for which the tolerance is applicable.
That is, it defines a region that contains a fraction of the true
isoline equal to the tolerance.

Example: water vapour from AMSU

The Advanced Microwave Sounding Unit (AMSU) series of satellite instruments
are designed to detect temperature and water vapour.  They have a high
horizontal resolution (as little as 15 km) and because they are
mounted on more than one satellite, full global coverage can be
obtained in less than one day.
Training data was generated using the second method from
European Centre for Medium-Range Weather Forecasts (ECMWF) ERA-40
data fed to a fast radiative transfer model called
RTTOV.
The function,  has been generated from
simulated retrievals and is shown in the figure to the right.
This is then used to set the 90 percent tolerance in the figure
below by shading all the confidence ratings less than 0.8.
Thus we expect the true isoline to fall within the shading
90 percent of the time.

For continuum retrievals

Isoline retrieval is also useful for retrieving a continuum variable
and constitutes a general, nonlinear inverse method.
It has the advantage over both a neural network, as well as iterative
methods such as optimal estimation that invert the forward model
directly, in that there is no possibility of getting stuck in a
local minimum.

There are a number of methods of reconstituting the continuum variable
from the discretized one.  Once a sufficient number of contours
have been retrieved, it is straightforward to interpolate between
them.  Conditional probabilities make a good proxy for
the continuum value.

Consider the transformation from a continuum to a discrete variable:

Suppose that  is given by a Gaussian:

where  is the expectation value and 
is the standard deviation, then the conditional probability is related to the
continuum variable, q, by the error function:

The figure shows conditional probability versus specific humidity for the example
retrieval discussed above.

As a robust estimator

The location of q0 is found by setting the conditional probabilities
of the two classes to be equal:

 

In other words, equal amounts of the "zeroeth order moment" lie on either side
of q0. This type of formulation is characteristic of a robust estimator.

References

External links
 Software for isoline retrieval

Remote sensing
Inverse problems